Arapiraca is a  municipality located in the center of the Brazilian state of Alagoas, some  from the state capital, Maceió. It was founded in 1924. , it has a population of 214.006, but IBGE estimated 233,047 inhabitants for 2020.

Arapiraca is the second largest city in Alagoas, and is known mostly for its production of tobacco, hence its nickname of "The Brazilian Tobacco Capital".

Neighboring municipalities 

Clockwise from the north:
 north: Igaci
 north-north-east: Craíbas
 north-east: Coité do Nóia
 east: Limoeiro de Anadia
 south-east: Junqueiro
 south-south-east: São Sebastião
 south: Feira Grande
 south-west: Lagoa da Canoa

Sports 
Agremiação Sportiva Arapiraquense, better known as ASA, is the city's football club. The club plays its home matches at the Estádio Municipal Coaracy da Mata Fonseca.

References 

Municipalities in Alagoas
Populated places established in 1924